Barbara Hamilton is the name of:

 Barbara Hamilton (courtier) (d. 1558), Scottish aristocrat
 Barbara Hamilton (actress) (1926–1996), Canadian actress
 Barbara Hamilton (drag racer), American drag racer
 Barbara Hamilton (judge), judge in Manitoba, Canada